Tillandsia complanata is a species of flowering plant in the genus Tillandsia. This species is native to Bolivia, Peru, northern Brazil, Colombia, Guyana, Costa Rica, Panama, Cuba, Jamaica, Trinidad, Venezuela and Ecuador.

References

complanata
Flora of Central America
Flora of South America
Flora of the Caribbean
Plants described in 1846